Marcantonio Pellini (1659-1760)  was an Italian painter, mainly as a figure painter during the Baroque period.

He studied in his native Pavia under Tommaso Gatti. He also worked in Venice and Bologna.

References

1659 births
1760 deaths
17th-century Italian painters
Italian male painters
18th-century Italian painters
Italian landscape painters
Painters from Lombardy
18th-century Italian male artists